Leselidze can refer to the following people and places, related to Georgia:

Leselidze (platform), a halt on the Psou-Engur railway line in Abkhazia
Leselidze (town), a town in Abkhazia, Georgia
Konstantin Leselidze, Soviet Georgian Colonel General and participant of World War II
Viktor Leselidze, lieutenant colonel, commander Mortar Regiment, Hero of the Soviet Union